U.S. Highway 41 (US 41) is a north–south highway United States Numbered Highway in eastern Wisconsin. It runs from Pleasant Prairie on the Illinois border north to Marinette on the Michigan border. Most of the route is concurrent with Interstate 41 in the state, with the exception of the portion between Howard, a suburb of Green Bay,  and Marinette.

Route description
US 41 is a freeway for nearly 85 percent of its route through Wisconsin, with the exceptions being a  expressway section from the US 141 interchange in Oconto County to Marinette and a  surface arterial section within Marinette. The highway runs concurrently with I-94 from Milwaukee to the Illinois border and concurrently with I-41 from Howard to the Illinois border.

US 41 runs northwest from Milwaukee and passes Fond du Lac, Oshkosh, and Appleton before heading to Green Bay. The route is a major access point for American Family Field, home of the Milwaukee Brewers Major League Baseball club, the EAA AirVenture Oshkosh air show in Oshkosh, and for Lambeau Field, the home of the Green Bay Packers NFL football team.

After leaving Green Bay, US 41 continues north to Abrams co-signed with US 141, and then it turns east off the co-signed route toward Marinette and into Michigan.

History
The first alignment of US 41 in Wisconsin, which extended south from Marinette to the Illinois state line, was defined generally by two state trunk highways in existence in 1926: WIS 15 from Marinette to Milwaukee, and WIS 57 from Milwaukee to the Illinois state line. Signs for the newly established highway were to be placed in spring of 1927. A meeting of the Wisconsin Highway Commission in 1926 decided that no new U.S. Highway number would overlap with an existing state route number; therefore, WIS 41 was retired and renumbered when US 41 came into existence.

In Milwaukee the original routing of US 41 used Lisbon Avenue east to North 27th Street, then south along that road to the Illinois state line. After the Stadium Freeway was built in the 1960s, US 41 followed that road from Lisbon Avenue south across I-94 to National Avenue and then east to 27th Street, which is known as Layton Boulevard between National Avenue and Lincoln Avenue. WisDOT rerouted US 41 along I-94 from the Stadium Interchange to the Illinois state line, removed Layton Boulevard north of Forest Home Avenue from the state highway system and gave Layton Boulevard and 27th Street south of Forest Home Avenue the designation of WIS 241 in a compromise to avoid expansion of the original route. The old US 41 freeway section south of I-94 to National Avenue (which was realigned to accommodate the construction of [[American Family Field]American Family Field]) was designated WIS 341 but is unsigned. Trailblazer signs label it Miller Park Way.

By 1955, US 41 was relocated from the corridor of today's WIS 175 and its successors to a nearby expressway in Winnebago, Fond du Lac, Dodge, Washington, Waukesha, and Milwaukee Counties.

In Green Bay, the road was rerouted in 1953 to make a curve to the right west of De Pere, going onto Ashland Avenue to the Green Bay city limits. It then turned left onto Highland Avenue (after 1968, Lombardi Avenue), going past Lambeau Field and curving right onto Military Avenue. It then turned left at Velp Avenue. US 41 then followed present day Velp Avenue north to Suamico where it merged with what is now the US 41 freeway. Until 1968 this was the outer highway for Green Bay; the area now is urbanized. The 1953–1968 Green Bay bypass was once again bypassed, sequentially, with the present US 41 freeway beginning at Velp, southerly to Lombardi in 1968; Velp north to Suamico in 1971; then from Lombardi south to De Pere in 1974.

Appleton also saw US 41 realignments over the course of time, beginning with the 1937 two-lane bypass (along the present freeway route) from Neenah northerly to a T-intersection with US 10 (today's Wisconsin Avenue, WIS 96). There, US 41 turned east with US 10, back to its original route at the intersection of US 10 (Wisconsin Avenue) and Richmond Street north of downtown Appleton, then north on Richmond to present day Northland Avenue. There it turned east on new alignment back to the original route northeast of Kaukauna. By 1962, the original Appleton bypass had been converted to four-lane divided highway from Oshkosh north to Northland Avenue, then north and east on new alignment bypassing the Northland Avenue bypass with the current freeway easterly to Kaukauna.

In the 1990s, a strategic effort was made along US 41 to convert the remaining expressway segments between Richfield and Abrams to freeway. The freeway conversion, which was completed by 2001, cleared the way for Interstate 41 to be designated along the corridor from the Illinois state line to Green Bay. Additionally, in the 2000s, the highway was upgraded to an expressway from Abrams to just west of Marinette, and included freeway bypasses around the cities of Oconto and Peshtigo.

Exit list

See also

References

External links

 Official US 41 Interstate conversion project page
 Official US 41 conversion brochure (PDF)

41
 Wisconsin
Freeways in the Milwaukee area
Lake Michigan Circle Tour
Transportation in Kenosha County, Wisconsin
Transportation in Racine County, Wisconsin
Transportation in Milwaukee County, Wisconsin
Transportation in Waukesha County, Wisconsin
Transportation in Washington County, Wisconsin
Transportation in Dodge County, Wisconsin
Transportation in Fond du Lac County, Wisconsin
Transportation in Winnebago County, Wisconsin
Transportation in Outagamie County, Wisconsin
Transportation in Brown County, Wisconsin
Transportation in Oconto County, Wisconsin
Transportation in Marinette County, Wisconsin